Loch Raven High School is a high school in Baltimore County, Maryland, United States.

History
The school was established in 1972 and is part of the Baltimore County Public School System. Some of the middle schools whose graduates then enter Loch Raven High are Pine Grove Middle School, Ridgely Middle School, Loch Raven Technical Academy, and Cockeysville Middle School.

Neighborhoods that feed into Loch Raven High School include:
Parkville, Maryland
Carney, Maryland
Towson, Maryland
Loch Raven, Maryland
Glen Arm, Maryland
Baldwin, Maryland
Hydes, Maryland
Hampton, Maryland

Academics
Loch Raven High school received a 55.2 out of a possible 90 points (61%) on the 2018-2019 Maryland State Department of Education Report Card and received a 4 out of 5 star rating, ranking in the 51st percentile among all Maryland schools.

Loch Raven High School offers the following AP Courses:

AP Biology
AP Calculus AB
AP Calculus BC
AP Chemistry
AP Computer Science A
AP English Language and Composition
AP English Literature and Composition
AP Environmental Science
AP French Language
AP U.S. Government and Politics
AP Human Geography
AP Macroeconomics
AP Microeconomics
AP Music Theory
AP Physics 1
AP Physics 2
AP Physics C: Electricity and Magnetism
AP Physics C: Mechanics
AP Psychology
AP Spanish Language
AP Statistics
AP Studio Art Drawing
AP US History
AP World History

Students
The 2019–2020 enrollment at Loch Raven High School was 874 students.

Athletics

State Championships
Girls Cross Country
1A 2004
Boys Cross Country
Class A 1976, 1981, 1983
2A 1990
1A 2002
Field Hockey
Class A 1979, 1987
2A 1992
Girls Soccer
2A-1A 1993, 1996
2A 1999 TIE
1A 2001 TIE, 2003, 2009
Boys Soccer
Class A 1974, 1975, 1977
1A 2009
Volleyball
Class A 1987
3A 1988
2A 1994
Girls Basketball
Class A 1976
Girls Lacrosse
2A-1A 1990, 1991, 1994, 1995
Boys Lacrosse
2A-1A 2006
Boys Track and Field
1A 2003
Baseball
Class AA 1983

Notable alumni
Pat Downey - professional mixed martial artist, submission grappler and freestyle wrestler
Sean Landeta - former professional football player
Ana Montes - convicted Cuban spy
John G. Trueschler - former member of the Maryland House of Delegates
Janine Tucker - (nee Kormanik) American lacrosse coach, all-time winningest coach at Johns Hopkins University

References

External links
 

Educational institutions established in 1972
Public high schools in Maryland
Baltimore County Public Schools
Middle States Commission on Secondary Schools
1972 establishments in Maryland